Bengtssenbukta is a bay at the northern side of Nordaustlandet, Svalbard. It is a western branch of Rijpfjorden. The glacier Rijpbreen debouches into the bay. The bay is named after trapper Karl J. Bengtssen.

References

Bays of Svalbard
Nordaustlandet